Jérôme Lempereur (born November 3, 1973 in Beauvais, France) is a retired professional footballer. He played as a striker.

References

External links
Jérôme Lempereur profile at chamoisfc79.fr

1973 births
Living people
Sportspeople from Beauvais
French footballers
Association football forwards
AS Beauvais Oise players
Louhans-Cuiseaux FC players
AJ Auxerre players
Nîmes Olympique players
Chamois Niortais F.C. players
K.A.A. Gent players
FC Gueugnon players
FC Rouen players
Ligue 2 players
Entente SSG players
Footballers from Hauts-de-France
French expatriate footballers
French expatriate sportspeople in Belgium
Expatriate footballers in Belgium
Belgian Pro League players